Group A of the 2004 Fed Cup Europe/Africa Zone Group II was one of two pools in the Europe/Africa Zone Group II of the 2004 Fed Cup. Four teams competed in a round robin competition, with the top two teams and the bottom two teams proceeding to their respective sections of the play-offs: the top two teams play for advancement to Group I, while the bottom two teams face potential relegation to Group III.

Great Britain vs. Egypt

Turkey vs. Romania

Great Britain vs. Turkey

Egypt vs. Turkey

Great Britain vs. Romania

Egypt vs. Romania

See also
Fed Cup structure

References

External links
 Fed Cup website

2004 Fed Cup Europe/Africa Zone